Shal Chway Ma is a 2018 Burmese comedy-drama film, directed by Ko Zaw (Ar Yone Oo) starring Yan Aung, Aung Ye Lin, Soe Myat Thuzar, Htet Htet Moe Oo and Khin Wint Wah. The film, produced by Sein Htay Film Production premiered Myanmar on April 27, 2018.

Cast
Yan Aung as Oakkar
Aung Ye Lin as Nay Min Khant
Soe Myat Thuzar as Moe Shwe Hlwar
Htet Htet Moe Oo as Hlaing Thitsar
Khin Wint Wah as Hsaung Than Zin

References

2018 films
2010s Burmese-language films
Burmese comedy-drama films
Films shot in Myanmar
2018 comedy-drama films